Clarence Herbert Bliss professionally billed as  "Little Billy" Rhodes, was an American stage and film character actor with dwarfism who was active in Hollywood from the 1920s through the 1960s. Over the course of his career, he appeared in noteworthy projects like The Wizard of Oz as the Barrister and The Terror of Tiny Town, the latter of which was a western that was billed as featuring an all-little-person cast.

Biography 
A native of Lynn, Massachusetts, "Little Billy" recalled that his father left the family upon realizing his son's short stature. "I grew up in awful poverty—simply awful," he said in an interview. "Mattress on the floor, that sort of thing." As a child, he sold newspapers to help make ends meet. 

At the age of 9, infatuated by the theater, "Little Billy" was taken in by Jerry Grady, a showman who would become Billy's manager. Appearing in vaudeville and on Broadway beginning in the 1910s, he eventually made it to Hollywood around 1926 and began appearing on-screen.

In the early 1940s, he headed a convention known as the International Midget League.

When asked about whether his height had a negative impact on his career, the actor had this to say: "I have never found my build a handicap. In fact, I consider it something of an asset. I have reached a fair measure of success in my life—success which would have been impossible if I had been of an ordinary build."

He died in Los Angeles, California, in 1967.

Selected filmography 

 1949 Skimpy in the Navy
 1941 Kiss the Boys Goodbye
 1940 You Nazty Spy! 
 1939 The Wizard of Oz
 1938 The Terror of Tiny Town
 1938 Marie Antoinette
 1938 The Daredevil Drivers
 1937 Artist and Models
 1936 Bengal Tiger
 1934 Men in Black
 1932 The Devil Is Driving
 1932 Make Me a Star
 1932 They Never Come Back
 1932 Polly of the Circus
 1932 The Shadow of the Eagle
 1930 Swing High
 1928 The Sideshow
 1926 Oh, Baby!

References 

American male film actors

Actors from Lynn, Massachusetts

1895 births

1967 deaths
Male actors from Massachusetts